USS PC-823 PC-461-class submarine chaser laid down on 2 June 1943 at the Leathem D. Smith Shipbuilding Company in Sturgeon Bay, Wisconsin; launched on 15 January 1944; and commissioned on 24 July 1944.

PC-823 served in the western Atlantic Ocean during World War II, being assigned to air-sea rescue duties during at least some of that time. On 11 February 1946, PC-823 decommissioned and transferred to the United States Maritime Commission. She was transferred to the United States Merchant Marine Academy at Kings Point, New York on 18 May 1948, and renamed Ensign Whitehead as a training ship. Her name was struck from the Navy List in June 1948.

In September 1949, she was transferred to the Republic of Korea Navy and renamed ROKS Baekdusan, (PC-701), and played a major part in the Battle of Korea Strait, the small naval battle fought on the first day of the Korean War in June 1950. The remains of her mast are kept in the South Korean naval academy.

South Korea

On 11 November 1945, when the South Korean navy (ROKN) was established, the ROKN had only LCVPs and light wooden patrol ships. The first Chief of Naval Operations of the ROKN, Admiral Son Won-il, emphasized the necessity to have a new naval ship replacing the deteriorated ships. However, South Korea was extremely poor immediately after independence from the Imperial Japan. Neither natural resources nor economic means were available to purchase new ships. Therefore, the ROKN decided to gather the cost of a new ship by themselves, organizing the ‘Vessel Construction Finance Committee’ in June 1949. From top officers down to cadets, they paid 5%~10% of their salary, and some of the midshipmen sold scrap metal to earn more money; their wives helped to earn money by taking in laundry and sewing. After four months, ROKN gathered $15,000. However this amount of money was not nearly enough to buy a naval vessel. After hearing of the efforts of ROKN, the South Korean government provided $45,000 more, for a total $60,000.

On 17 October 1949, South Korea finally acquired the Ensign Whitehead (the former USS PC-823), at that stage a training ship of the United States Merchant Marine Academy. Fifteen naval officers spent two months in the U.S. to fix her. The ship was in such poor condition that the only thing working was the engine. At last, on 26 December 1949 at New York, ROKN's first ocean-going naval vessel, Baek-du-san (PC-701) was born. Sailing from New York, a 3-inch main deck gun was attached at the Hawaii Naval Station, and 100 shells were purchased at Guam. PC-701 finally arrived at Jinhae Naval Base, South Korea, on 10 April 1950, barely two months before the June 1950 outbreak of the Korean War. With only 100 rounds ammunition, the sailors could only practice aiming the main gun, not firing it.

On the night of 25/26 June 1950, on the South Korean eastern coast, she patrolled against infiltrators from the north. About twenty miles from the key port of Busan its crew sighted an unidentified ship. The PC-701 challenged the ship using signal lights, but receiving no response, turned its searchlight on the intruder. The light revealed a 1,000 ton freighter with an estimated six hundred to one thousand soldiers crowded on her decks. Heavy machine guns were mounted aft on the freighter with which the freighter crew opened fire on PC-701. The gunfire struck PC-701's bridge, killing the helmsman and seriously wounding the officer of the deck. She returned fire and engaged in a running duel with the freighter. According to veterans of PC-701, to increase the accuracy and penetration, PC-701 closed to within 400 meters of the freighter. The sailors had to use their M1 Garands to prevent North Korean soldiers from swimming to PC-701. The freighter was sunk between Busan and Tsushima Island. This was the modern ROKN's first battle and is known as Battle of Korea Strait.

After Battle of Korea Strait, she was used in many battles in Korean War, like Incheon Landing.

After war, she retired in July 1, 1959 and after dismantled.

Except for the fortuitous position of the PC-701 and the fighting qualities of the craft's crew, the North Korean soldiers might have successfully landed at the vital port of Busan. The poor state of combat readiness at the port could easily have led to its loss. In such an event, not even the small toehold of Busan would have remained to support the U.N. counteroffensive in Korea. This single naval action may well have prevented the fall of South Korea.

Fate 
Her mast is preserved at Republic of Korea Navy Academy.

Further reading
NavSource Online:Submarine Chaser Photo Archive PC-823

References

External links
 Photo gallery at navsource.org

World War II naval ships of the United States
PC-461-class submarine chasers
1944 ships
Ships transferred from the United States Navy to the Republic of Korea Navy